George Allen Abrams (November 9, 1899 – December 5, 1986) was a Major League Baseball pitcher who made three relief appearances for the Cincinnati Reds in its 1923 season.

A single in his only MLB at-bat left Abrams with a perfect career batting average of 1.000.

External links

1899 births
1986 deaths
Baseball players from Washington (state)
Bridgeport Americans players
Cincinnati Reds players
Enid Harvesters players
Major League Baseball pitchers
Tacoma Tigers players